Eduardo Chozas Olmo (born 5 July 1960 in Madrid) is a Spanish former professional road racing cyclist. He won four stages at the Tour de France and three in the Giro d'Italia. He was also chosen as the most combative rider of 1990 Tour de France.

As of 2014, Chozas holds the record for most Grand Tour participations and finishes. He started in a total of 26 Grand Tours (6 Tours, 7 Giros and 13 Vueltas), and finished in 25 of them, only abandoning the 1984 Vuelta a España on the last stage.

Career achievements

Major results

1979
 3rd Clásica a los Puertos
1980
 2nd Overall Vuelta a la Comunidad Valenciana
 9th Overall Deutschland Tour
1st Stage 5b
1981
 2nd Overall Vuelta Asturias
1st Stage 1
 3rd Clásica a los Puertos
1983
 1st Overall Vuelta Ciclista a la Rioja
 1st Overall Vuelta a Andalucía
1st Stage 2
 1st Clásica de Sabiñánigo
 1st GP Camp de Morvedre
 3rd Overall Vuelta a Burgos
 3rd Clásica a los Puertos
 6th Overall Vuelta a España
 8th Overall Giro d'Italia
1st Stage 5
1984
 1st Stage 4 Vuelta a la Comunidad Valenciana
 3rd Overall Setmana Catalana de Ciclisme
 10th Overall Volta a Catalunya
1985
 3rd Overall Tour de l'Aude
 7th Subida a Arrate
 8th Overall Route du Sud
 9th Overall Tour de France
1st Stage 15
1986
 1st Stage 17 Tour de France
1987
 1st Stage 22 Tour de France
 3rd Trofeo Luis Puig
 6th Trofeo Masferrer
 9th Overall Critérium du Dauphiné Libéré
1990
 1st Overall Vuelta a Andalucía
 1st Stage 2 Giro d'Italia
 3rd Overall Vuelta a Murcia
 6th Overall Tour de France
1st Stage 13
 Combativity award
1991
 5th Overall Vuelta a Murcia
1st Stage 4a
 10th Overall Giro d'Italia
1st Stage 13
1992
 3rd Clásica a los Puertos
1993
 2nd Clásica de Almería
 5th Overall Vuelta a Murcia

Grand Tour general classification results timeline

References

External links
 

Official Tour de France results for Eduardo Chozas

Living people
Spanish male cyclists
1960 births
Spanish Tour de France stage winners
Spanish Giro d'Italia stage winners
Cyclists from Madrid